Ronald McKinnon  (born August 8, 1951) is a Canadian politician, who was elected to represent the riding of Coquitlam—Port Coquitlam in the House of Commons of Canada in the 2015 federal election, and was re-elected in 2019 and 2021.

Early life
Born in Alberta, McKinnon holds a Bachelor of Science from the University of Alberta and an honours diploma in Computer Technology from the Southern Alberta Institute of Technology.

Political career
A supporter of electoral reform, McKinnon has proposed Canada adopting a ranked pairs voting system.

In the 42nd Canadian Parliament McKinnon introduced Bill C-224, the Good Samaritan Drug Overdose Act in the House of Commons on February 22, 2016.  The bill amends the Controlled Drugs and Substances Act to grant immunity for possession of controlled substances when someone calls for emergency medical assistance when someone is experiencing a drug overdose, so fear of arrest will not prevent people from seeking the necessary medical care. The bill was adopted on May 4, 2017, with all parties supporting the bill.

Personal life
He is married to Christine and has two daughters, Katherine and Sarah.

Electoral record

References

External links

1951 births
Living people
Canadian bloggers
Computer systems engineers
Liberal Party of Canada MPs
Members of the House of Commons of Canada from British Columbia
People from Port Coquitlam
University of Alberta alumni
21st-century Canadian politicians